The Russian Citizens Union (KROSRA) is a political party and organization in Abkhazia which unites local Russian communities and organizations. It was founded in 1994 and is led by Gennady Vasilyevich Nikitchenko, a member of the People's Assembly of Abkhazia. 

In the past, the organization has taken a stance in opposition to the government. The newspaper of the organization is Russian Word.

References 

Political parties in Abkhazia
Secessionist organizations in Europe
Secessionist organizations in Asia